This name uses Portuguese naming customs. the first or maternal family name is Dos Santos and the second or paternal family name is Pinto.
José Luis dos Santos Pinto better known as Zezinho (born 14 March 1992), is a Brazilian football player who plays for Joinville.
He has also played for the Brazilian national youth teams.

Career

Juventude
Zezinho began his football career at Juventude and was promoted to the A team in 2008. On 3 June 2009, he made his first team debut in a 1–0 home loss against Paraná, coming on as a second-half substitute, replacing Edimar. Two weeks later, Zezinho was sent off for first time in his senior career, during a game against Bragantino. On 5 August, he scored his first goal for Juventude against Portuguesa. Zezinho then scored in Juventude's 2–0 win over Fortaleza on 19 September 2009, taking his tally for the season to 2 goals. He earned 21 Série B appearances.

Santos (loan)
On 10 February 2010, Zezinho was loaned out to Série A club Santos. He was assigned the number 8 shirt. Zezinho made his competitive début for Santos in the Campeonato Paulista on 8 April 2010, starting alongside Zé Eduardo in attack in Santos's 4–2 victory over Sertãozinho. On 6 June, in a Série A match against Vasco da Gama, he assisted Madson for the fourth goal as Santos cruised to a 4–0 win.

Then Zezinho transferred to Deportivo Maldonado on 18 August 2010, and immediately rejoined Santos on a loan deal until December 2011.

Bahia (loan)
On 30 December 2010, Bahia announced they had reached agreement for the loan of Zezinho to the club for the 2011 season. Few days later his loan contract with Santos was terminated by mutual consent. He made only one appearance for the club in Série A until he requested the termination of his contract with Bahia in November 2011.

Statistics
Updated 18 December 2011.

References

External links

Living people
1992 births
Brazilian footballers
Brazilian expatriate footballers
Brazil youth international footballers
Campeonato Brasileiro Série A players
Campeonato Brasileiro Série B players
Primeira Liga players
Esporte Clube Juventude players
Santos FC players
Esporte Clube Bahia players
Club Athletico Paranaense players
Associação Chapecoense de Futebol players
Atlético Clube Goianiense players
C.D. Nacional players
Ceará Sporting Club players
Deportivo Maldonado players
Paraná Clube players
Esporte Clube São Bento players
Rio Branco Sport Club players
Joinville Esporte Clube players
Association football midfielders
Brazilian expatriate sportspeople in Portugal
Brazilian expatriate sportspeople in Uruguay
Expatriate footballers in Portugal
Expatriate footballers in Uruguay